Brian Lawrence Malkinson  (born 1985) is a Canadian politician who was elected in the 2015 Alberta general election to the Legislative Assembly of Alberta representing the electoral district of Calgary-Currie. In 2018, he accepted the position of Minister of Service Alberta. He was defeated in his re-election bid in the 2019 Alberta general election by 191 votes to Nicholas Milliken.

Education 
Brian has a Bachelor of Science (programming) from Simon Fraser University in British Columbia, where he also served as president and vice-president of the Interactive Arts and Technology Student Union.

29th Alberta Legislature

Legislative Committees 
Malkinson served as deputy chair of the Select Special Ombudsman and Public Interest Commissioner Search Committee and the Standing Committee on Legislative Offices. He also served as a member of the Standing Committee on Public Accounts and the Standing Committee on Resource Stewardship. Malkinson previously served as a member of the Standing Committee on Alberta Heritage Savings Trust Fund.

Electoral history

2019 general election

2015 general election

2014 by-election

2012 general election

References

1985 births
Alberta New Democratic Party MLAs
Living people
Members of the Executive Council of Alberta
Politicians from Calgary
21st-century Canadian politicians